Topman is a UK-based multinational men's fashion retail brand founded by Burton Group (later renamed Arcadia Group) in 1978. Along with its women's clothing counterpart Topshop and the rest of Arcadia Group, Topman went into administration in late 2020. All high street stores subsequently closed and the brand was purchased by ASOS on 1 February 2021, relaunching as an online-only retailer.

Arcadia Group financial problems 

In May 2019, the BBC and The Wall Street Journal both reported that, after its parent company Arcadia Group filed for bankruptcy, Topshop would close all 11 of its U.S. stores, including Topman. Apparel would be distributed digitally and through other wholesale partners, such as Nordstrom.

Administration
In the UK, Arcadia Group went into administration at 8pm GMT on 30 November 2020. On 25 January 2021, ASOS said it was in "exclusive" talks to buy Arcadia's Topshop, Topman, Miss Selfridge and HIIT brands out of administration, though it only wanted the brands, not the shops. A consortium including Next had earlier dropped a bid to buy Topshop and Topman; interest in Arcadia operations had also been expressed by Mike Ashley's Frasers Group, a consortium including JD Sports, and online retailer Boohoo.

On 1 February 2021, ASOS announced it had acquired the four Arcadia brands out of administration for £265 million, paying an additional £65 million for current and pre-ordered stock. ASOS will keep 300 employees on as part of the deal but will not keep any of the brands' 70 stores, putting 2,500 jobs at risk. They plan to relaunch in May 2021.

Products

Topman was nominated for the 'Menswear Design of the Year' award by the British Fashion Council, winner of 'Best Fashion Retailer' at the Maxim Style Awards for 2005 and winner of 'Best High Street Retailer' at the 2007 FHM Fashion and Grooming awards.

In 2008, Topman collaborated with new label The Look Presents, the creation of rock-fashion author Paul Gorman and Soho boutique owner, Max Karie, to launch 'the Look Presents'.

In 2011, Topman worked closely with Teenage Cancer Trust. The company worked in collaboration with children from the charity to produce a range of sunglasses designed by them whilst supporting the 'Rock your Shades' campaign in May 2011.

References

External links
 Official website

2021 disestablishments in the United Kingdom
2021 disestablishments in England
2021 mergers and acquisitions
Clothing retailers of the United Kingdom
Retail companies disestablished in 2021
Retail companies established in 1978
Companies that have entered administration in the United Kingdom
Companies that filed for Chapter 11 bankruptcy in 2019